Sidney Richard Clute (April 21, 1916 – October 2, 1985) was an American film and television actor. He was notable for playing Detective Paul La Guardia on 57 episodes of the American police procedural drama Cagney & Lacey (1982–85). He also played "Detective Simms" on 10 episodes in McCloud.

Clute guest-starred in numerous television programs including Hawaii Five-O, Emergency!, The Rockford Files, Kolchak: The Night Stalker, All in the Family, Adam-12 and The Mary Tyler Moore Show. He also appeared in a few episodes of Lou Grant, Wagon Train, Hogan's Heroes, My Three Sons and Cannon. Clute died on October 2, 1985, of cancer at the St. George Hospital in Los Angeles, California, at the age of 69.

Filmography

Film

Television

References

External links 

Rotten Tomatoes profile

1916 births
1985 deaths
People from Brooklyn
Deaths from cancer in California
American male film actors
American male television actors
20th-century American male actors